Livingston County is a county located in the U.S. state of Kentucky. As of the 2020 census, the population was 8,888. Its county seat is Smithland and its largest city is Salem, but its largest community is the census-designated place of Ledbetter.  The county was established in 1798 from land taken from Christian County and is named for Robert R. Livingston, a member of the Committee of Five that drafted the U.S. Declaration of Independence. The county was strongly pro-Confederate during the American Civil War and many men volunteered for the Confederate Army. Livingston County is part of the Paducah, KY-IL Micropolitan Statistical Area. It is a prohibition or dry county with the exception of Grand Rivers which voted to allow alcohol sales in 2016.

History

Geography 
The western border with Illinois is formed by the Ohio River.

Adjacent counties
 Hardin County, Illinois  (north)
 Crittenden County  (northeast)
 Lyon County  (southeast)
 Marshall County  (south)
 McCracken County  (southwest)
 Massac County, Illinois  (west)
 Pope County, Illinois  (northwest)

Major highways
 U.S. Route 60
 U.S. Route 62
 Interstate 24
 Interstate 69

Demographics 

As of the census of 2010, there were 9,519 people living in the county. The racial makeup of the county was 98.49% White, 0.14% Black or African American, 0.42% Native American, 0.03% Asian, 0.01% Pacific Islander, 0.28% from other races, and 0.63% from two or more races.  0.75% of the population were Hispanics or Latinos of any race.

There were 3,996 households, out of which 29.50% had children under the age of 18 living with them, 60.40% were married couples living together, 7.90% had a female householder with no husband present, and 27.60% were non-families. 24.40% of all households were made up of individuals, and 11.00% had someone living alone who was 65 years of age or older.  The average household size was 2.42 and the average family size was 2.86.

The age distribution was 22.30% under the age of 18, 7.50% from 18 to 24, 28.20% from 25 to 44, 27.00% from 45 to 64, and 14.90% who were 65 years of age or older.  The median age was 40 years. For every 100 females, there were 97.80 males.  For every 100 females age 18 and over, there were 97.70 males.

The median income for a household in the county was $31,776, and the median income for a family was $39,486. Males had a median income of $33,633 versus $19,617 for females. The per capita income for the county was $17,072.  About 7.60% of families and 10.30% of the population were below the poverty line, including 10.70% of those under age 18 and 15.80% of those age 65 or over.

Communities

Cities 
 Carrsville
 Grand Rivers
 Salem
 Smithland (county seat)

Census-designated places 
 Burna
 Ledbetter (largest community)

Other unincorporated communities

North Livingston
 Hampton
 Joy
 Lola

South Livingston
 Iuka
 Lake City
 Tiline

Notable people
 Andrew Jackson Smith (September 3, 1843 – March 4, 1932) was a runaway slave, Union Army soldier during the American Civil War. He was awarded the Medal of Honor for his actions at the Battle of Honey Hill.
 James Ford (1775-1833), was a civic leader and businessman who was later discovered to be the secret criminal leader of a gang of Ohio River pirates and highwaymen in the early 19th century.

Politics

See also

 Dry counties
 National Register of Historic Places listings in Livingston County, Kentucky

References

External links
 Livingston County KY Website

 
Kentucky counties
Kentucky counties on the Ohio River
Paducah micropolitan area
1798 establishments in Kentucky
Populated places established in 1798